Mar Hershenson is a Spanish-American venture capitalist, electrical engineer, professor, and business executive in the electronic design automation industry. She is the co-founder and managing partner at Pear VC. In 2021, she ranked #29 on Forbes' Midas List.

Education and work
Hershenson graduated with honors with a B.S. in Electrical Engineering from the Universidad Pontificia Comillas in Madrid, Spain.

She earned M.S. and Ph.D. (2000) from Stanford University. Her graduate research involved application of convex optimization to analog circuit design.

As a graduate student as Stanford, she was CTO and co-founder of Barcelona Design. Later she was CEO and a co-founder of Sabio Labs (2004-2007), which was acquired by Magma Design Automation, and eventually, Mar Hershenson became Vice President of Product Development in the Custom Design Business Unit at Magma. (2008-2010)

From 2002-2011, she was consulting assistant professor in electrical engineering at Stanford.

Since 2013, she is a founding managing partner at Pear VC (founded as Pejman Mar) and represents Pear on the Board of Directors of Solvvy, a startup developer of a customer support platform designed to answer incoming customer questions basing on machine learning.

She was described as "one of the leading women in venture capital in the Bay Area".

Awards and recognition
2011: Women of Influence Award by Silicon Valley/San Jose Business Journal 
2010: Marie Pistilli Award
2009: Top Ten Women in Microelectronics by EE Times   
2002: MIT Technology Review’s TR100 Innovators under 35

Personal life
She came to the United States from Barcelona, Spain for a summer job and met her future husband. Her native city gave the name to the company she co-founded.

 she has three children.

References

External links
Mar Hershenson, the LinkedIn webpage

Year of birth missing (living people)
Living people
Electronic design automation people
American women engineers
Electronic engineering award winners
Stanford University faculty
Stanford University alumni
Spanish emigrants to the United States
21st-century American women
Midas List